Robson Glacier is a glacier, about  long, which flows north from the Gonville and Caius Range along the east side of Red Ridge. It merges with the general flow of ice toward Granite Harbour southward of Redcliff Nunatak. Named by the Western Journey Party, led by Taylor, of the British Antarctic Expedition, 1910–13.

References

Glaciers of Victoria Land